Robert Huscher (born January 23, 1938) is an American bobsledder who competed in the late 1960s. He won a bronze medal in the four-man event at the 1969 FIBT World Championships in Lake Placid, New York.

References
Bobsleigh four-man world championship medalists since 1930
Wallechinsky, David (1984). "Bobsled: Two-man". In The Complete Book of the Olympics: 1896 - 1980. New York: Penguin Books. p. 559.

American male bobsledders
Bobsledders at the 1968 Winter Olympics
Living people
1938 births
Olympic bobsledders of the United States